Abramowitz and Stegun (AS) is the informal name of a 1964 mathematical reference work edited by Milton Abramowitz and Irene Stegun of the United States National Bureau of Standards (NBS), now the National Institute of Standards and Technology (NIST). Its full title is Handbook of Mathematical Functions with Formulas, Graphs, and Mathematical Tables.  A digital successor to the Handbook was released as the "Digital Library of Mathematical Functions" (DLMF) on 11 May 2010, along with a printed version, the NIST Handbook of Mathematical Functions, published by Cambridge University Press.

Overview
Since it was first published in 1964, the 1046 page Handbook has been one of the most comprehensive sources of information on special functions, containing definitions, identities, approximations, plots, and tables of values of numerous functions used in virtually all fields of applied mathematics. The notation used in the Handbook is the de facto standard for much of applied mathematics today.

At the time of its publication, the Handbook was an essential resource for practitioners. Nowadays, computer algebra systems have replaced the function tables, but the Handbook remains an important reference source. The foreword discusses a meeting in 1954 in which it was agreed that "the advent of high-speed computing equipment changed the task of table making but definitely did not remove the need for tables".

The chapters are:
 Mathematical Constants
 Physical Constants and Conversion Factors
 Elementary Analytical Methods
 Elementary Transcendental Functions
 Exponential Integral and Related Functions
 Gamma Function and Related Functions
 Error Function and Fresnel Integrals
 Legendre Functions
 Bessel Functions of Integral Order
 Bessel Functions of Fractional Order
 Integrals of Bessel Functions
 Struve Functions and Related Functions
 Confluent Hypergeometric Functions
 Coulomb Wave Functions
 Hypergeometric Functions
 Jacobian Elliptic Functions and Theta Functions
 Elliptic Integrals
 Weierstrass Elliptic and Related Functions
 Parabolic Cylinder Functions
 Mathieu Functions
 Spheroidal Wave Functions
 Orthogonal Polynomials
 Bernoulli and Euler Polynomials, Riemann Zeta Function
 Combinatorial Analysis
 Numerical Interpolation, Differentiation, and Integration
 Probability Functions
 Miscellaneous Functions
 Scales of Notation
 Laplace Transforms

Editions
Because the Handbook is the work of U.S. federal government employees acting in their official capacity, it is not protected by copyright in the United States. While it could be ordered from the Government Printing Office, it has also been reprinted by commercial publishers, most notably Dover Publications, and can be legally viewed on and downloaded from the web.

While there was only one edition of the work, it went through many print runs including a growing number of corrections.

Original NBS edition:

 1st printing: June 1964; errata:
 2nd printing with corrections: November 1964; errata:
 3rd printing with corrections: March 1965; errata:
 4th printing with corrections: December 1965; errata:
 5th printing with corrections: August 1966
 6th printing with corrections: November 1967
 7th printing with corrections: May 1968
 8th printing with corrections: 1969
 9th printing with corrections: November 1970
 10th printing with corrections: December 1972

Reprint edition by Dover Publications:

 1st printing: 1965
 ?
 9th printing with additional corrections (based on 10th printing of NBS edition with corrections)

Related projects
Michael Danos and Johann Rafelski edited the Pocketbook of Mathematical Functions, published by Verlag Harri Deutsch in 1984. The book is an abridged version of Abramowitz's and Stegun's Handbook, retaining most of the formulas (except for the first and the two last original chapters, which were dropped), but reducing the numerical tables to a minimum, which, by this time, could be easily calculated with scientific pocket calculators. The references were removed as well. Most known errata were incorporated, the physical constants updated and the now-first chapter saw some slight enlargement compared to the former second chapter. The numbering of formulas was kept for easier cross-reference.

A digital successor to the Handbook, long under development at NIST, was released as the “Digital Library of Mathematical Functions” (DLMF) on 11 May 2010, along with a printed version, the NIST Handbook of Mathematical Functions, published by Cambridge University Press.

See also
 Mathematical Tables Project, a 1938–1948 Works Progress Administration (WPA) project to calculate mathematical tables, including those later used in Abramowitz and Stegun's Handbook of Mathematical Functions
 Numerical analysis
 Rubber book, a Handbook of Chemistry & Physics
 Reference book
 Handbook
 MAOL, a Finnish handbook for science
 BINAS, a Dutch science handbook
 Philip J. Davis, author of the Gamma function section and other sections of the book
 Louis Melville Milne-Thomson, author of the book chapters on elliptic integrals and Jacobi elliptic functions
 Digital Library of Mathematical Functions (DLMF), from the National Institute of Standards and Technology (NIST), is intended to be a replacement for Abramowitz and Stegun's Handbook of Mathematical Functions
 Boole's rule, a mathematical rule of integration sometimes known as Bode's rule, due to a typo in Abramowitz and Stegun (1972, p. 886) that was subsequently propagated.

Notes

References

Further reading
 
  (NB. A history of the activities leading up to and surrounding the development of the Handbook.)

External links
 A high quality scan of the book, in PDF and TIFF formats, hosted at the University of Birmingham, UK
 The book in scanned format, now hosted at the University of British Columbia, CA (formerly at Simon Fraser University). # but this scan dropped tables of numbers. For example, the pages contained table of abscissas and weights of Gauss quadrature formulas are omitted. Only formulas are scanned. 
 Another scanned version by ConvertIt.com
 numerical.recipes  download - NBS, Tenth Printing, December 1972, with Corrections - PDF without Search
 NIST Digital Library of Mathematical Functions, the digital successor of the Handbook

1964 non-fiction books
Handbooks and manuals
Mathematics books
Mathematical tables
Numerical analysis
Reference works in the public domain
Special functions